The Predictor Paul (Chinese: 章鱼哥) is a 2014 Chinese animated comedy fantasy romance film directed by Shi Yang and starring Hao Xianghai, Zhang Wei and Xu Jing.

Cast
Hao Xianghai
Zhang Wei
Xu Jing

References

2014 films
2014 romantic comedy films
2014 fantasy films
2014 animated films
Animated comedy films
Animated romance films
Chinese animated fantasy films